The Bucharest Articulated Tramcar series is a series of tram vehicles produced between 1971 and 1992 by URAC, the main workshops of the Bucharest Transit Company (Întreprinderea de Transport București (ITB)). Various modernized variants have also been delivered since 1993. For the last 50 years they have been the backbone of the tram network in Bucharest, replacing motor-trailer formations that had run in the city since the introduction of electric trams.

Members
The tramcar "family" features its following members:

V3A is the flagship of this series, and was the first one to be produced. Overall this was the most produced in the series and the only one in usage today.
V3B/V3A-2S is a variation of the V3A type, which features doors on both sides and cabs at both ends, unlike the V3A with only door on one side and cab at the front. The type appeared in the mid 1980s when construction works in Bucharest frequently disrupted the traffic, so the URAC converted a few V3As into V3Bs as prototypes for future usage. With refurbishments since the 1990s, several examples were converted back to V3A, the withdrawal of the last original V3Bs taking place in 2007.
V2A was the second standard tram of the series, appearing in the early 1980s for lines with lower passenger numbers. They were deemed surplus after 25 years of usage and later scrapped, with their parts being recycled on V3A-CH-PPCs.
V2B/V2A-2S was the 2-section variant of the V3B, at first being exclusively used for the what is now light rail line of tram 41, because at the beginning it terminated at Crângași, where a loop could not be built due to the ongoing reconstructions in the area. Eventually they suffered the same fate as the V2As, serving their last years on line 44 in Giulești that was disrupted due to works at the Basarab Overpass.
The official name of these cars is "VxA", where V comes from "vagon" (railcar/tramcar), x(2 or 3) is the number of car segments, and A comes from "articulated". The bi-directional versions of these cars are named V3A-2S and V2A-2S, but they are better known as V3B and V2B due to the German railway/tram magazines, likely due to the fact that RATB employees were naming them "bi-directional V3A/V2A" or "Siamese V3A/V2A" (from Siamese twins), as they are in fact more or less two trams in one. 2S, thus, likely comes from "2 cabs/Siamese".

They are also split into three generations: the first one was introduced in 1971, but today it has very few members still surviving, the second one was introduced in 1993 and constitutes most of the examples still in service today, while the third generation, introduced in 2006 is set to replace the second generation in the near future.

History
Soon after communism in Romania came to power, the authorities wanted to modernize the Bucharest tram network, that at the time used ancient V09 trams from the 1920s. For a while the only solutions they could come up with were the V54 trams introduced by Electroputere from Craiova, and the  trams made by URAC. However they were not enough for Bucharest's quick expansion in the 1960s. It soon became apparent that a new type of tram was needed for the growing network. In 1968 an agreement was reached with Linke-Hofmann-Busch (LHB) from Salzgitter-Brunswick, West Germany, that the following year a 3 section tram would be delivered (based on the LHB GT6) and a licence would be agreed upon. Indeed, the prototype was delivered in 1969 and tested in revenue service the following years, until it was scrapped in 1991. In 1970 the tram was dismantled for an inspection, where the designers for the project would modify some of its technicalities for the V3A project. The V3A prototype was manufactured in 1971, and was presented that same year on 4 May 1971, at the 100 year anniversary of the tram operation, where it ran on the newly operated tram line 30 in the Titan neighborhood. Series production ultimately started in 1972. By 1992, the following vehicles were produced:

However, the V3A prototypes' fate was not as happy as it was thought. The original agreement included the local assembly of 100 CKD kits received from LHB, with the prototype to be possibly returned, should that idea had worked. However the LHB accused the ITB of having illegally dismantled and copied the designs of their tram, and that the V3A was nothing but a pirate-copy of the LHB 3501 tram. Eventually the dispute was settled and both trams could continue working in the ITB's fleet.

The most noticeable modifications made was removal of lightweight fibreglass material from the trams, thus increasing their weight from 15 to 25 tonnes, moving the third door's location in the second section of the articulated tram, the less-aerodynamic design which gave the tram a boxy-shape, compared to the round shape of the 3501 prototype, modified destination display and minor interior modifications. The first examples were allocated to the Dudești Depot to be used on lines serving the Titan housing estate.

Eventually by the end of 1979 a total of 293 vehicles were made, and the V3A became the flagship of the ITB fleet, slowly replacing the V54s that were now modernized with electric equipment coming from the V3As and the V56s that were slowly withdrawn thanks to the introduction of the Tatra T4R trams from Czechoslovakia.

However, with the early 1980s, these trams would soon be introduced in other cities in Romania. The huge debt that had been accumulated by the Romanian government between 1977 and 1981 meant that imports were tightly restricted, meaning that importing Tatra trams was not allowed any more and fuel import restrictions meant that buses were becoming less efficient. The local authorities then turned to electrification of public transport in cities as a solution, which included the addition and expansion of trolleybus and tram networks. At the same time the Timiș 2 made in Timișoara had more success than the V3A, however some city councils desired to have articulated trams instead of a traction car-trailer car formation.

In 1982, a tram car named V2A was introduced, being designed for lines (and later, networks) with smaller number of passengers, such as the tram lines in the Giulești, Berceni and Colentina neighborhoods of Bucharest. To counter the success of the Timiș 2 trams, in 1984 the V3A and V2A were finally adapted for export to other cities, the exports starting that very same year to Constanța's newly founded tram network. However the same year, Bucharest's network was soon being faced with mass demolitions that threatened the disruption of most tram lines, and the solution of temporary track relocation was not possible like the previous times when the metro works forced tram lines to detour. To answer to this issue, ITB modified a few V3A trams that were made in 1974 and 1978, and added doors on both sides and cabs at both ends. The result was called V3B or V3A-2S. The experiment was successful, however no new trams would be produced from this. In 1986, new V2B trams were produced which were similar to the V2A trams but had the same defying characteristic as the V3B did: double cabs and double doors. In 1987 the 500th V3A tram left the factory. The last tram to leave the factory was number 362 which was made in 1990.

By the 1990s, in Bucharest however, the series was becoming outdated, so a modernization project started, called "V3A-93". The prototype was finished in 1993, in time for the 100 year anniversary of electric trams which featured a parade. By the early 2000s they quickly replaced the EP/V3A trams (modernizations of the V54 trams) and the Rathgeber and Duewag trams from Munich and Frankfurt, brought second hand from 1992 to 1997. The last of the original V3A trams (later designated V3A-71 due to their year of manufacture) were retired in 2007, however they were replaced with a newer tram type that was known as V3A-CH-PPC (CHopper and Partial Low-floor/Podea Parțial Coborâtă). The V3B trams were also quickly replaced with V3B-93 trams, being the last trams from the 1993 model to be made, thus making the oldest PPC trams older than the newest 1993 model trams.

The modernization was not only done by RATB's workshops, however. Because the RATB workshops were too small to modernize a lot of trams in such a short time, this meant that an agreement was reached with FAUR, which helped with the modernization between 1995 and 2004. Not only that, but various types of modernizations were experimented. For example, a special type of modernization, known as M2000 was developed for the reconstruction of the light rail line 41. These featured bumpers, a red front paint and high-speed pantographs. Electroputere modernized a few trams between 1997 and 2002, 3 of them featuring Holec electric equipments, etc.

The end of the V2A trams started officially in 2004 when a few older trams were retired, however starting from 2008 the official withdrawal began due to their age and old technology they used, being replaced with V3A-CH-PPC trams, with the last ones' operation ending in 2010. Also in 2010 the last V2B trams were retired, being replaced with a V3B-10 variant what was not much different from the V3B-93 variant, featuring the same body as the 93 variant however featuring electrics from the 10 variant.

However, by 2013, it became clear that the modernization introduced in the 1990s was starting to show its age too. The main problem was the fact that these trams are all high floor vehicles, and despite being easy to maintain, they would have to be retired from service anyway due to non-compliance to EU transportation rules. So the same year two units were retired and modernized. The modernization is very similar to the CH-PPC variant, however the main modification was in the electric part. Here, the traction motors work on AC instead of DC, giving them the designation CA-PPC (Curent Alternativ-Podea Parțial Coborâtă). They were trialed in 2013 and introduced in 2014. From 2016 to 2017, the official modernizations started, marking the beginning of the end of the V3A-93 era. In 2019, air conditioning systems from Liebherr began to be installed on 46 V3A-CH-PPC units.

By 2021 as all of the 46 CH-PPC trams are due for major repairs, they have been re-modernized and have brought new features, like the overhauled interior, CCTV surveillance, better passenger information with two ultrawide displays, USB plugs, holstered seats and new validators that also allow debit cards as payment. These have been painted in STB's new Lime Green livery, introduced first with the Mercedes-Benz Citaro Hybrid buses. There is also plans to modernize 50 more standard V3A-93 trams with environmental funds for the next two years, which will also bring an upgraded AC drive.

Operation in other towns
Starting from 1984, the V2A/V3A family has operated outside Bucharest too, with their operation ending in 2008.

Constanța
Constanța was the first beneficiary of this tram series. Their operation started in 1984, with deliveries continuing till 1990 and totalling up to 75 vehicles. They would be joined in the late 1990s by Tatra KT4D trams from Berlin. However, due to the slow closure of the network in the 2000s during Radu Mazăre's tenure as mayor, they were slowly withdrawn, with the last one being retired in 2008. Until 2012, they could still be noticed in the depot, however since then they have been scrapped.

Ploiești
Ploiești got these trams in 1987 and in 1988, along with a fleet of Timiș 2 trams. An interesting aspect of the fleet of Ploiești trams was that their numbers alternated, as noticed above. They were retired in the mid 2000s, replaced by Tatra KT4Ds from Potsdam.

However another V3A tram exists at Ploiești. This tram was manufactured in 1998 by FAUR, and was given to the public transport company, in consideration to replace the older V3As. Eventually the plan was dropped, and the tram was kept as a unique vehicle, currently being stored due to lack of parts.

Brașov
RAT Brașov received its fleet in 1987, once with the opening of its system. It was made of 20 trams initially. They were all retired with the closure of the system in 2006. Legend has it that Brașov was supposed to get Timiș 2 trams, and Craiova was supposed to have V3A trams, but the order was messed up and Brașov got V3A instead, with Craiova getting Timiș 2.

Cluj-Napoca
CTP Cluj-Napoca received its V2A and V3A fleet in 1987 as well, when its system was also opened. However the trams would not last long there, and would be sold to Iași and Botoșani in the early 1990s,

Oradea
Oradea Transport Local received its V2A and V3A trams between 1988 and 1990 to replace the 30-year old V54 trams. Their lifetime was also short as they were sold to Iași in the early 1990s.

Brăila
Brăila received 10 V3A trams in 1989, which were used up until the early 2000s, being replaced with Rotterdam GT8 trams. Some V3A trams had their middle sections removed, being transformed into V2A.

Botoșani
Botoșani received 10 V3A trams in 1990, and in 1992 another few V3A trams from Cluj-Napoca, all being retired by 2005, replaced with Tatra T4Ds from Dresden.

Iași
CTP Iași had a fleet of 25 V2A trams that were inherited from Oradea and Cluj, plus one metre-gauge prototype from 1992. From 1993 until 1994, RATP Iași took delivery of the second hand examples that came from Cluj and Oradea. To be able to run on the metre-gauge network, Nicolina Works Iași took care for mounting the new axles and among other modifications, they included the doors, destination displays, etc. They were extensively used until 2001, when they were all gradually withdrawn by 2004, being replaced with imported German trams. Currently only one has been put into storage awaiting for preservation.

Gallery

References

External links

V3A modernized tram specifications (car nr 205)

URAC trams
Transport in Bucharest